Francis Anthony Quinn (September 11, 1921 – March 21, 2019) was an American Roman Catholic prelate who served as the Bishop of the Diocese of Sacramento from 1980 to 1993.

Background 
Born in Los Angeles, California, he graduated from St. Joseph’s Seminary and was ordained a priest for the Archdiocese of San Francisco on June 15, 1946. He earned an MA in education from the Catholic University of America, Washington, D.C., in 1947 and an Ed.D. from the University of California, Berkeley, in 1962.

Quinn was a teacher at Serra High School, San Mateo, and a counselor at Sacred Heart Cathedral Preparatory, San Francisco, before becoming an assistant superintendent of schools for the Archdiocese of San Francisco in 1955. He was editor for the San Francisco Monitor in 1962 and was appointed pastor of St. Gabriel’s Church in 1970.

Bishop 
Under Pope Paul VI, Quinn was consecrated an auxiliary bishop of San Francisco on June 29, 1978, and installed as the seventh bishop of the Diocese of Sacramento on December 18, 1979.

From 1980-1992, seven new parishes, several missions, two elementary schools, and one high school were established. He oversaw a 10-year pastoral plan for the diocese as well as a spiritual renewal program, reorganized the deanery structure, initiated a diocesan pastoral council, and celebrated the hundredth anniversary of the diocese.

Quinn inspired and encouraged women to lead in parish governance, educational, liturgical, financial and social ministries. He also activated lay individuals to continue their formation and assume leadership roles in various groups and movements. He supported the launch of an AIDS hospice and he protested the death penalty on the steps of the Capitol and at prison gates. He also spoke up regarding nuclear disarmament, immigration policies, and many foreign issues.

Bishop Quinn High School in Palo Cedro, California, is named in his honor, but closed in 2008 from low enrollment.

Retirement and death 
Quinn retired in 1993, and spent several years with the Yaquis in Arizona. In 2007, he returned to the Diocese of Sacramento. He took up residence at Mercy McMahon Terrace, a residence for seniors run by the Sisters of Mercy in midtown Sacramento, and continued to serve as an activist for social justice and human rights issues, especially for the poor.

Quinn died on March 21, 2019, at the age of 97. At the time of his death, he was the oldest living bishop in the United States.

See also
 

 Catholic Church hierarchy
 Catholic Church in the United States
 Historical list of the Catholic bishops of the United States
 List of Catholic bishops of the United States
 Lists of patriarchs, archbishops, and bishops

References

External links
 Roman Catholic Diocese of Sacramento official website
 A conversation with Bishop Francis A. Quinn last retrieved February 25, 2007.

Episcopal succession

1921 births
2019 deaths
Roman Catholic bishops of Sacramento
People from Los Angeles
Roman Catholic Archdiocese of San Francisco
Catholic University of America alumni
University of California, Berkeley alumni
20th-century Roman Catholic bishops in the United States